Kinmen County is represented in the Legislative Yuan since 2008 by one at-large single-member constituency (Kinmen County Constituency).

Current district
 Kinmen County

Legislators

 Yang Cheng-wu resigned in 2018 after elected Kinmen County magistrate.

Election results

2020

2016

References 

2008 establishments in Taiwan
Constituencies in Taiwan
Kinmen